The 1991 NAIA World Series was the 35th annual tournament hosted by the National Association of Intercollegiate Athletics to determine the national champion of baseball among its member colleges and universities in the United States and Canada.

The tournament was played at Harris Field in Lewiston, Idaho.

Hometown team and four-time defending champions Lewis–Clark State (48–7) defeated Oral Roberts (60–15) in a single-game championship series, 7–0, to win the Warriors' seventh NAIA World Series. This would go on to be the fifth of six consecutive World Series championships for the program.

Lewis–Clark State designated hitter Greg Umfleet was named tournament MVP.

Bracket

Preliminary bracket

Championship bracket

See also
 1991 NCAA Division I baseball tournament
 1991 NCAA Division II baseball tournament
 1991 NCAA Division III baseball tournament
 1991 NAIA Softball World Series

Reference

|NAIA World Series
NAIA World Series
NAIA World Series
NAIA World Series